Champvoux is a commune in the Nièvre department in central France. On 1 January 2019, the estimated population was 297.

See also
Communes of the Nièvre department

References

Communes of Nièvre
Nièvre communes articles needing translation from French Wikipedia